These are the official results of the Men's Long Jump event at the 1997 IAAF World Championships in Athens, Greece. There were a total number of 39 participating athletes, with two qualifying groups and the final held on Tuesday August 5, 1997.

Medalists

Qualifying round
Held on Sunday 1997-08-03

Final

See also
 1994 Men's European Championships Long Jump
 1996 Men's Olympic Long Jump
 1997 Long Jump Year Ranking
 1998 Men's European Championships Long Jump

References
 Results

L
Long jump at the World Athletics Championships